The Hassel is a river of Saxony-Anhalt, in the East Harz Mountains in Germany. It flows through several municipalities including Stiege and the town of Hasselfelde. Its source is located not far from Stiege. After about  it flows into the Hassel Auxiliary Dam and later into the Rappbode Reservoir.

See also
List of rivers of Saxony-Anhalt

Rivers of Saxony-Anhalt
Rivers of the Harz
Rivers of Germany